Sarcomelicope glauca is a species of plant in the family Rutaceae. It is endemic to New Caledonia.

References

Endemic flora of New Caledonia
glauca
Critically endangered plants
Taxonomy articles created by Polbot